GPGP may refer to:

 Great Pacific garbage patch, or Pacific Trash Vortex, a rotating ocean current containing marine litter
 Generalized Partial Global Planning (computer science), see Task analysis environment modeling simulation (TAEMS)
 General-purpose computing on graphics processing units
 GpGp (software), see Comparison of Gaussian process software
 Glucosyl-3-phosphoglycerate phosphatase (GpgP), an enzyme
 Government by the People Green Party (GPGP), former name of the Green Party of South Africa

See also 
 GPG (disambiguation)
 PGP (disambiguation)
 GP (disambiguation)
 GP2 (disambiguation)